Khalid El Bakouri (born 12 April 1994) is a Dutch-Moroccan kickboxer, currently competing in the middleweight division of Enfusion. He is the current Enfusion Middleweight Champion.

As of September 2021, Combat Press ranks him as the #10 middleweight in the world.

Kickboxing career
El Bakouri was scheduled to fight Cédric Tousch at King Of The Ring 5 on April 9, 2016. He lost the fight by unanimous decision.

El Bakouri was scheduled to fight Martin Reemeijer at Enfusion Talents 62 on November 17, 2018. He won the fight by unanimous decision.

El Bakouri was scheduled to face Jorge Loren at Enfusion 77 on December 7, 2018. Loren won the fight by unanimous decision.

El Bakouri rebounded from this loss by notching two consecutive victories. He first won a unanimous decision against Soufyan Assa at Enfusion 78 on February 23, 2019. This was followed by a third-round technical knockout of Edwin Martirosian at Enfusion Talents 71 on June 8, 2019. 

El Bakouri was scheduled to fight Anis Bouzid for the vacant Enfusion -90kg title at Enfusion 87 on September 7, 2019. El Bakouri won the fight by unanimous decision.

El Bakouri was scheduled to face the reigning -95kg champion Ibrahim El Boustati in a non-title bout at Enfusion 95 on September 29, 2020. He won the fight by a first-round knockout.

Championships and accomplishments
Enfusion
 2019 Enfusion Middleweight World Championship
 2022 Enfusion Middleweight (-84 kg) Tournament Winner

Kickboxing record

|-  style="background:#cfc;"
| 2022-10-22 || Win || align=left| Kevin van Heeckeren || Enfusion 113, Tournament Finals || Wuppertal, Germany || Decision (Unanimous) || 3 || 3:00
|-
! style=background:white colspan=9 |
|-
|-
|-  style="background:#cfc;"
| 2022-06-05 || Win || align=left| Vangelis Tzotzil || Enfusion 107, Tournament Semifinals || Darmstadt, Germany || TKO (Cut) || 2 || 
|-
|-  style="background:#fbb;"
| 2021-11-12 || Loss || align=left| Mohammad Ghaedibardeh || Enfusion 104 || Abu Dhabi, United Arab Emirates || Decision ||  5 || 3:00
|-
! style=background:white colspan=9 |
|-  style="background:#cfc;"
| 2020-09-29|| Win || align=left| Ibrahim El Boustati || Enfusion 95 || Eindhoven, Netherlands || KO  || 1 ||
|-  style="background:#cfc;"
| 2019-09-07 || Win || align=left| Anis Bouzid || Enfusion 87 || Darmstadt, Germany|| Decision (Unanimous) || 5 || 3:00
|-
! style=background:white colspan=9 |
|-  style="background:#cfc;"
| 2019-06-08 || Win || align=left| Edwin Martirosian || Enfusion Talents 71 || Groningen, Netherlands || TKO (Three knockdowns) || 3 ||
|-  style="background:#cfc;"
| 2019-02-23|| Win || align=left| Soufyan Assa || Enfusion 78 || Eindhoven, Netherlands || Decision (Unanimous) || 3 || 3:00
|-  style="background:#fbb;"
| 2018-12-07|| Loss || align=left| Jorge Loren || Enfusion 77 || United Arab Emirates || Decision (Unanimous)|| 3 || 3:00
|-  style="background:#cfc;"
| 2018-11-17 || Win || align=left| Martin Reemeijer || Enfusion Talents 62|| Groningen, Netherlands || Decision (Unanimous) || 3 || 3:00
|-  style="background:#fbb;"
| 2018-05-05|| Loss || align=left| Ulric Bokeme || Enfusion Live 66 || Tenerife, Spain|| Decision (Unanimous)|| 3 || 3:00
|-  style="background:#fbb;"
| 2017-11-05|| Loss || align=left| Anis Bouzid || MTK Fight Night 2|| Belgium|| Decision (Unanimous)|| 3 || 3:00
|-
! style=background:white colspan=9 |
|-  style="background:#cfc;"
| 2017-09-16 || Win || align=left| Robin Ciric || Enfusion Talents #36 	|| Groningen, Netherlands || KO  || 2 ||
|-  style="background:#fbb;"
| 2017-04-29 || Loss || align=left| Reda Zaidi || Enfusion Talents 31 || The Hague, Netherlands || Decision (Unanimous)|| 3 || 3:00
|-  style="background:#fbb;"
| 2017-02-18 || Loss || align=left| Nick Morsink || Enfusion Talents 28 || Eindhoven, Spain|| Decision (Unanimous)|| 3 || 3:00
|-  style="background:#cfc;"
| 2016-11-20 || Win || align=left| Erwin vd Beld || Enfusion 56 || Groningen, Netherlands || Decision (Unanimous) || 3 || 3:00
|-  style="background:#cfc;"
| 2016-06-28 || Win || align=left| Lutciano Zimmerman || Enfusion Talents 14 || Gent, Belgium || Decision (Unanimous) || 3 || 3:00
|-  style="background:#fbb;"
| 2016-04-09|| Loss || align=left| Cédric Tousch || King Of The Ring 5 || Longeville-lès-Metz, France || Decision (Unanimous)|| 3 || 3:00
|-  style="background:#fbb;"
| 2016-02-07|| Loss || align=left| Ertugrul Bayrak || Enfusion 36 || Eindhoven, Netherlands || Decision (Unanimous)|| 3 || 3:00
|-  style="background:#cfc;"
| 2015-11-21 || Win || align=left| Mohamed Kabiri || Glorious Heroes in Groningen || Groningen, Netherlands || KO (Right hook) || 2 ||
|-  style="background:#cfc;"
| 2015-04-19 || Win || align=left| Ibrahim El Bouni || The Best of all Elements || Almere, Netherlands || Decision || 3 || 3:00
|-  style="background:#cfc;"
| 2015-02-07 || Win || align=left| Kamil Jenel || Enfusion 24 || Eindhoven, Netherlands || Ext. R. Decision || 4 || 3:00
|-  style="background:#fbb;"
| 2014-12-21|| Loss || align=left| Ibrahim El Boustati || Enfusion Live 23 || Antwerp, Belgium || Decision (Unanimous) || 3 || 3:00
|-  style="background:#cfc;"
| 2014-11-23 || Win || align=left| Alva Remor || Enfusion 22 || Groningen, Netherlands || Decision (Unanimous) || 3 || 3:00
|-  style="background:#cfc;"
| 2014-11-15 || Win || align=left| Rain Kärkinen|| XPLOSION 2014 || Tallinn, Estonia || Decision (Unanimous) || 3 || 3:00
|-  style="background:#fbb;"
| 2014-09-20 ||Loss||align=left| Hicham El Gaoui || A1 World Combat Cup - Final 8, Super Fight (82 kg)|| Eindhoven, Netherlands || Decision|| 3|| 3:00
|-
|-  style="background:#cfc;"
| 2014-04-21 || Win || align=left| Iwna Pang || Quinn Gym Fight Night 2 || Venray, Netherlands || KO (Right hook) || 2 ||
|-  style="background:#cfc;"
| 2014-03-07 || Win || align=left| Muzaffer Gemici || ? || Turkey ||Decision (Unanimous) || 3 || 3:00
|-  style="background:#cfc;"
| 2013-11-16 || Win || align=left| Kenneth Susanna  || Quinn Gym Fight Night || Venray, Netherlands || KO (Right hook) || 1 ||
|-  style="background:#cfc;"
| 2013-05-23 || Win || align=left| Randy Momoh || Glorious Heroes Presents Enfusion IV || Annen, Netherlands || Ext. R Decision (Unanimous) || 4 || 3:00
|-
| colspan=9 | Legend:

See also
 List of male kickboxers

References

Living people
1994 births
Dutch male kickboxers
Moroccan male kickboxers
Middleweight kickboxers
Sportspeople from Venlo